Zoologische Verhandelingen was a Dutch  scientific journal covering research in zoology. It was published between 1948 and 2002 by the Rijksmuseum van Natuurlijke Historie in Leiden. All issues are available online.

References 

Zoology journals
Publications established in 1948
Publications disestablished in 2002
Defunct journals
Multilingual journals